SS Russell Sage was a Liberty ship built in the United States during World War II. She was named after Russell Sage, a member of the U.S. House of Representatives from New York, financier, and railroad executive.

Construction
Russell Sage was laid down on 25 November 1943, under a Maritime Commission (MARCOM) contract, MC hull 1545, by J.A. Jones Construction, Panama City, Florida; she was launched on 5 January 1944.

History
She was allocated to Marine Transport Lines, Inc., on 29 February 1944. On 26 February 1947, she was sold for $544,506 to Caribbean Land & Shipping Corp., for commercial use.

After going through several owners, in 1967, she was named Nikolis M and owned by Miltiades Navegaceon and sailing under a Greek flag when she stranded in Isabela de Sagua.

References

Bibliography

 
 
 
 
 
 
 

 

Liberty ships
Ships built in Panama City, Florida
1944 ships
Maritime incidents in 1967